Eric Senior Worthington (29 December 1925 – 16 November 2006) was an English professional footballer and football coach who played as a forward. After a playing career which included spells in the Football League with Watford and Bradford City, he was appointed the first ever manager of the England women's national team in 1972. He later coached the men's national teams of Australia and Papua New Guinea. He is a member of Australia's Football Hall of Fame.

Playing career
After two years at Queens Park Rangers without appearing in the first team, Worthington made his Football League debut with Watford after joining in August 1949. He combined his duties as a schoolmaster and professional footballer, making 30 appearances for the Hornets over two seasons before dropping into non–league with Dover. A prolific spell with Dover saw a brief return to the league ranks with Bradford City in September 1953, before, weeks later, he was back in Kent with Margate while doing a teacher training course.

Worthington remained with Margate eight years, overcoming injuries to make 243 appearances in both attack and midfield, scoring 36 goals and captaining the team on occasion. He retired in 1961 to take up a position at Loughborough College.

Coaching career
Worthington was the original manager of the England women's national football team, taking charge for their first official match against Scotland in 1972. The following year he was appointed director of coaching by Australian Soccer Federation and was tasked with overhauling the entire structure of football coaching in Australia. He was later hailed as an "outstanding servant" and "pioneer", though his administration's apparent preference for British coaches led to allegations of "jobs for the boys" and a "pommie mafia". In 1975 Worthington took charge of the Australia national soccer team for four friendlies at B level.

Worthington coached the Papua New Guinea national team during their Olympic qualifiers in 1976. He retired as director of coaching in 1989 and his last official role was taking an Australian student select team to his home city of Sheffield for the 1991 Summer Universiade. He was inducted into the Australian Football Hall of Fame in 1999.

References

1925 births
2006 deaths
Footballers from Sheffield
English footballers
Association football forwards
Hendon F.C. players
Willesden F.C. players
Queens Park Rangers F.C. players
Watford F.C. players
Dover F.C. players
Bradford City A.F.C. players
Margate F.C. players
English Football League players
English football managers
England women's national football team managers
Australia national soccer team managers
Academics of Loughborough University
Expatriate soccer managers in Australia